John Michael Johnson (born June 23, 1968, in San Antonio, Texas, USA) is a retired American bantamweight boxer He made his professional debut in 1986 and was a WBA bantamweight world champion

Professional career 
Known as "Bam Bam," Johnson turned professional in 1986. In 1994 he won the WBA bantamweight title by knocking out Junior Jones in the 11th round. Later that year, Johnson controversially lost the belt in his first defense to Daorung Chuvatana in Thailand. Near the end of the first round, Johnson sustained a cut above his right eye from a headbutt, however, the referee ruled that it was caused by a punch and the fight was called off upon the recommendation of the ringside doctor, resulting in a first round technical knockout victory for Chuwatana. Johnson immediately filed a protest on the grounds that the injury had been caused by a headbutt and that a technical draw should have been declared. In 1999 he challenged Lehlohonolo Ledwaba for the vacant IBF super bantamweight title but lost by decision.

Johnson was married to Sandra Johnson. They have three children, John Michael Johnson Jr., Alexandra Marie Johnson, and Jessica Michelle Johnson.

In 2001 Johnson made a comeback and scored four victories, including a technical knockout over Antonio Diaz and a knockout in the first round over Augie Sanchez. Due to his success, he was named Ring Magazine comeback of the year. Johnson lost both of his bouts in 2002 and retired later in the year.

On September 29, 2014, Johnson lost an eight-round fight to Ricardo Alvarez by unanimous decision.

|-

References

External links 
 

1968 births
Living people
World boxing champions
American male boxers
Bantamweight boxers